The South Coast Line is an intercity rail service operated by NSW TrainLink that services the Illawarra region of New South Wales, Australia.

Passenger trains first operated on the South Coast railway line in 1887, and is one of five routes on the NSW TrainLink Intercity network. The South Coast Line routes span 40 stations, across  of railway.

History

Stations
The line was further extended to  through , opening on 2 June 1893.

Throughout its long history, the South Coast Line's roster of stations has changed significantly. Many stations in the Upper Illawarra had closed and new ones opened towards the first half of the 20th century. Stations such as the ones serving Clifton were closed, along with a majority of the original railway between Waterfall and Coalcliff between 1915 and 1920, replaced with a new alignment that made use of a flatter gradient and made the infamous Otford Tunnel defunct.

While the railway network at Port Kembla was built in 1916, stations and passenger trains servicing the surrounding suburbs did not operate until 5 January 1920, when the Port Kembla railway station was opened. A railway station for workers at Port Kembla, named , after the nearby Lysaght steel plant, was also opened in 1938.

Some platforms on the line (e.g. Scarborough) are only 4 or 6 cars long, so not all doors may open on 8-car trains.

Services and rolling stock
Services were originally operated with locomotive-hauled trains and, later, Diesel railcars, prior to the electrification of the South Coast railway line. Electrification extended to  the following year. Despite the newly installed electrification, diesel sets and locomotive-hauled trains still operated along the line from  all the way past Wollongong to Sydney, including the South Coast Daylight Express, until 1991.

The electrified rolling stock of the South Coast Line began with V set intercity trains. There were later accompanied by Tangaras when they were introduced into the CityRail network in 1988. Originally, the Tangaras that ran on the South Coast Line were different variations of T sets known as G sets. G sets differed from T sets in that they had reversible seats, toilets, fresh water dispensers and luggage racks. In late 2005, it was discovered that a majority of the V set rolling stock operating on the South Coast Line were suffering from corrosion in their underframes. More G sets were introduced onto the South Coast Line to compensate, and eventually became the standard rolling stock on the South Coast Line after V sets ceased operating on the service. From January 2012, V sets ceased operating South Coast services. In 2009, however, after the introduction of OSCARs onto the intercity CityRail network, All G sets were recalled for conversion into T sets. The OSCAR fleet effectively replaced the G set rolling stock and, since 2010, standard Sydney Trains T sets, owned by NSW TrainLink, have been operating services to Port Kembla.

In 2017, it was revealed that the Liberal state government had reviewed a 3.6 billion dollar tunnel between Thirroul and Waterfall that could reduce travel time between Sydney and Wollongong by 22 minutes, but that rail improvements were being sidetracked in favour of improving and extending the nearby Princes Motorway.

Incidents
One of the trains jack-knifed onto the platform, demolishing the concrete pedestrian bridge. No injuries or casualties, however, were reported. 

The accident was the third major accident resulting in fatalities on the CityRail network in 13 years, after the Cowan rail accident in 1990 and Glenbrook rail accident in 1999.

Services were resumed four days later, after the derailed train was removed from the tracks. The train had derailed immediately after coming out of the Clifton tunnel, with the front eight clearing the tunnel and derailing, and the rear twelve carriages remaining inside the tunnel. The Office of Transport Safety Investigations found that the cause of the derailment was a broken axle.

Services

At other times, services depart from Central (Sydney Terminal). They generally use platform 15, but this can change at short notice, as with all services from Sydney Terminal.

Some peak hour and weekend services are listed as pickup only at intermediate suburban stations (eg. Redfern, Hurstville, Sutherland). This restriction is to ensure the train does not fill up with suburban passengers, who have plenty of other suburban services to take. Pickup only stations are not displayed on platform screens, but will be displayed on in-train screens.

The most common Central to  services are operated by 4/8 car H sets (OSCARs). All-stations services operate between Waterfall, Thirroul and Port Kembla with 4-car T sets (Tangaras).

From 2023, all services are to be taken over by 4 and 6 car D Sets. This will free up H sets for transferral to suburban railway work. Two-car Endeavour sets will continue to operate the Kiama to Bomaderry section. These are set to be replaced by the new bi-modal regional fleet in 2023.

Stopping patterns
Weekday Peak Hours

There are no set stopping patterns for peak hours, however every 20 minutes a service operates between Bondi Junction all stations to Central (Platforms 24/25), Redfern (Platform 11/12), Wolli Creek, Hurstville and the South Coast. Some trains start/end at Wollongong and Thirroul. There are also some local services starting at Waterfall or Thirroul.

Weekday Off-Peak
 Central (i), Redfern, Wolli Creek, Hurstville, Sutherland, Helensburgh, Thirroul, North Wollongong, Wollongong then all stations (except Kembla Grange) to Kiama (operates every 60 minutes)
 Kiama then all stations to Bomaderry/Nowra (operates every 120 minutes – connects with every second Central-Kiama train)
 Waterfall then all stations to Port Kembla via Thirroul and Wollongong (operates every 60 minutes)

Weekends
 Bondi Junction, all to Redfern, Wolli Creek, Hurstville, Sutherland, Waterfall then all stations to Thirroul, then North Wollongong, Wollongong and then all stations to Kiama (operates every 120 minutes)
 Bondi Junction, all to Redfern, Wolli Creek, Hurstville, Sutherland, Waterfall, Thirroul, North Wollongong, Wollongong and then all stations to Kiama, connecting with the Bomaderry train (operates every 120 minutes)
 Kiama then all stations to Bomaderry/Nowra (operates every 120 minutes – connects with express Bondi Junction-Kiama train)
Thirroul, then all to Port Kembla (irregular frequency, connects with each train from Bondi Junction)

Rarer patterns

Some late night or early morning services:

 run between Wollongong and Port Kembla/Kiama only
 make all stops between Sutherland and Waterfall (since T4 suburban services are not operating at this time)
 start at Waterfall, connecting off a T4 suburban train, but then follow the Kiama stopping pattern
 replaced by a bus service between Kiama and Bomaderry/Nowra

Some afternoon services:

 start at Helensburgh, but run as a T4 service, using the same stopping patterns as T4 Waterfall services
 divide at Wollongong, with only the front 4 cars continuing past Wollongong

Stations

Patronage

References

External links
Regional Transport Information Transport for NSW

NSW TrainLink
Wollongong
South Coast (New South Wales)